Cymindis wrasei is a species of ground beetle in the subfamily Harpalinae. It was described by Kabak in 2006.

References

wrasei
Beetles described in 2006